Never Gonna Dance Again can refer to:

 the common name of the 1984 George Michael single, "Careless Whisper"
 "Never Gonna Dance Again" (Sugababes song), a song by Sugababes from the album Change
 Never Gonna Dance Again (album), 2020 album by South Korean singer Taemin